The Cuthites is a name describing a people said by the Hebrew Bible (Old Testament of Christianity) and the first century historian Josephus to be living in Samaria around 500 BCE. The name comes from the Assyrian city of Kutha, in line with the claim that the Samaritans were descendants of settlers placed in Israel by the Neo-Assyrian Empire after the destruction of the northern Kingdom of Israel around 720 BCE. The label "Cuthites" was a pejorative name for Samaritans in later rabbinic literature.

The modern scholarly view is that Yahweh worshippers in the north of Ancient Israel outnumbered post-722 BCE Assyrian settlers, with those settlers assimilating into the existing Yahwist population. The "Cuthites", therefore, were not a foreign population in Israel but instead "a branch of Yahwistic Israel in the same sense as the Jews."

Cuthites in Jewish literature
The Cuthites were to blame for the postponing of the construction of the Second Temple, during the reign of Cyrus the Great. They did this after the Jewish people returned from Babylonian exile, and first agreed to help them, but after the Jews refused, they lied to king Cyrus who postponed the building process.

The Cuthites are mentioned in Josephus, Antiquities Book 11, Chapter 4, as "Cutheans", naming them as those who were brought from Media and Persia and "planted" in Samaria by the King of Assyria after he had conquered the Ten Tribes of Israel.

See also
Cuthah (Kutha), archaeological site, now in Babil, Iraq
Nergal, deity worshiped in Cuthah
Cuthean Legend of Naram-Sin

References

Ethnic groups in the Middle East